A list of people, who died just prior to (babies slaughtered in an effort to eliminate the newborn King of the Jews) or during the 1st century, who have received recognition as Saints (through canonization) from the Catholic Church:

Table

See also 

Christianity in the 1st century
Twelve Apostles

References

01
 Christian saints
Saints